Confetti are small pieces or streamers of paper, mylar, or metallic material which are usually thrown at celebrations, especially parades and weddings. The origins are from the Latin confectum, with confetti the plural of Italian confetto, small sweet. Modern paper confetti trace back to symbolic rituals of tossing grains and sweets during special occasions, traditional for numerous cultures throughout history as an ancient custom dating back to pagan times, but adapted from sweets and grains to paper through the centuries.
Confetti are manufactured in multiple colors, and commercially available confetti come in many different shapes. A distinction is made between confetti and glitter; glitter is smaller than confetti (pieces usually no larger than 1mm) and is universally shiny. Most table confetti are also shiny. While they are called metallic confetti they are actually metallized PVC. The most popular shape is the star. Seasonally, Snowflake Confetti are the most requested shape. Most party supply stores carry paper and metallic confetti. Confetti are commonly used at social gatherings such as parties, weddings, and Bar Mitzvahs. The simplest confetti are simply shredded paper (see ticker-tape parade), and can be made with scissors or a paper shredder. Chads punched out of scrap paper are also common.  A hole punch makes small round chads, and a ticket punch makes more elaborate chads.  Most pieces of paper flats will flutter as tumblewings giving long flight times.

In the early 21st century the use of confetti as a cosmetic addition to trophy presentations at sporting events became increasingly common. In this case, larger strips of paper (typically measuring 20 mm × 60 mm) in colors appropriate to the team or celebration are used. For smaller volumes of confetti, ABS or PVC "barrels" are filled and the confetti is projected via a "cannon" (a small pressure vessel) using compressed air or carbon dioxide. For larger venues or volumes of confetti, a venturi air mover powered by carbon dioxide is used to propel significantly larger volumes of confetti greater distances.

History
Since the Middle Ages, in Northern Italy it was common usage for the participants of carnival parades to throw objects at the crowd, mostly mud balls, eggs, coins or fruit. These traditions are still present in some towns in different forms, such as the "Battle of the Oranges" in Ivrea.

The use of throwing objects at parades is well documented in Milan since the 14th century. The nobles used to throw candies and flowers during the parades while dames threw eggshells filled with essences and perfumes. Lower-class people mocked the nobles by throwing rotten eggs, and battles among enemy factions or districts became common. In 1597, the city governor Juan Fernández de Velasco imposed a ban on the eggs throwing, along with banning squittaroli (spraying liquids in the street) and other immoral behaviors. The custom disappeared for about a century, coming back in the 1700s in the form of launch of small candies, mostly sugar-coated seeds. The seeds used for the sugar candies were mostly Coriander (coriandolo in Italian), a common plantation in the area: the Italian name for confetti is indeed coriandoli.

The candies were expensive, though, and the lower classes often used small chalk balls instead, called benis de gess (chalk candy). Those were officially defined as "the only material allowed to be thrown during the parades" in an edict by the Prefect of Milan in 1808, but the battles fought with them in the 1800s became too large and dangerous, with hundreds of people involved, leading to a ban of the chalk pellets. People circumvented the ban by using mud balls.

In 1875, an Italian businessman from Milan, Enrico Mangili, began selling paper confetti for use in the upcoming carnevale di Milano, the yearly parade held along the streets of the city.

At that time, the province of Milan was one of the main hubs of silk manufacturing. Mangili begun collecting the small punched paper disks that were left as a byproduct from the production of the holed sheets used by the silkworm breeders as cage bedding, and selling them for profit. The new paper confetti was well received by the customers, being less harmful, funnier and cheaper than the alternatives, and their use quickly replaced previous customs in Milan and northern Italy.

Scientific American recorded that the throwing of paper confetti (plain shredded paper) occurred at the 1885 New Year's Eve in Paris. Paper confetti became common in all of Europe in just a couple of decades later (unlike ticker tape parades, which never received as wide a diffusion as they did in the U.S.).

Game shows still used the classic balloon tradition for big wins until the late 1990s.

Alternatives

Some weddings use natural petal confetti. These are made from freeze-dried flower petals and are completely biodegradable. In fact, venues may now only allow these biodegradable versions to be used. Some wedding venues have decided that due to the mess and potential inconvenience caused by the use of confetti to ban its usage completely. One way that this restriction has been circumvented is to use soap bubbles in place of confetti.

Etymology and Italian confetti 

The English word confetti (to denote Jordan almonds) is adopted from the Italian confectionery of the same name, which was a small sweet traditionally thrown during carnivals. Also known as dragée or comfit, Italian confetti are almonds with a hard sugar coating; their name equates to French confit. The Italian word for paper confetti is coriandoli which refers to the coriander seeds originally contained within the sweet.

By tradition, the Italian confetti (sugar coated almonds) are given out are thrown at weddings (white coating) and baptisms (blue or pink coating, according to the sex of the newborn baby), or graduations (red coating), often wrapped in a small tulle bag as a gift to the guests. For a wedding, they are said to represent the hope that the new couple will have a fertile marriage. The British adapted the missiles to weddings (displacing the traditional grains or rice symbolising sexual fertility) at the end of the 19th century, using symbolic shreds of coloured paper rather than real sweets.

See also
 Chad (paper), recycling paper fragments into confetti use.
 Confetti candy
 Sulmona
 Chaff (countermeasure), metallized paper fragments used for radar jamming

References

External links 
 
 

Paper products
Party equipment
Almonds
Italian inventions
Candy